Lorene is a given name. Notable people with the name include:

Lorene Cary (born 1957), American author, educator, and social activist
Lorene T. Coates, Democratic member of the North Carolina General Assembly
Lorene Mann (1937–2013), American country music singer-songwriter
Lorene Ramsey, American pioneer in women's sports, one of the most successful college coaches of all time
Lorene Rogers (1914–2009), American biochemist and educator, president of the University of Texas at Austin in the 1970s
Lorene Scafaria, American screenwriter, playwright, actor and singer known for her work on the 2008 film Nick and Norah's Infinite Playlist
Lorene Yarnell of Shields and Yarnell, American mime team formed in 1972

See also
"Lorene (song)", 1960 song by the Louvin Brothers
Lareine
Loren (disambiguation)
Lorena (disambiguation)
Loraine (disambiguation)
Loreen (disambiguation)
Lorraine (disambiguation)